Vishlaq-e Sofla (also Romanized as Vīshlaq-e Soflá and Vīshlaq Soflā; also known as Ashaga Veshlya, Vaslar Āshāghi, Vishlagh Sofla, Vīshlaq-e Pā’īn, and Vīshlaq Pā’īn) is a village in Valdian Rural District, Ivughli District, Khoy County, West Azerbaijan Province, Iran. At the 2006 census, its population was 377, in 91 families.

References 

Populated places in Khoy County